Lorry is a 1980 Malayalam film directed by Bharathan and written by Padmarajan. It stars Achankunju, Balan K. Nair, Nithya, Meena and Prathap Pothan.

Plot
Velan (Achan Kunju) is a street circus performer. He kidnaps and forcibly blinds village children and turn them into fellow circus performers. Once, he falls in love with one of his victims, Rani (Nithya), as does his lorry driver friend Ouseph (Balan K. Nair). Eventually, Ouseph and Velan kill each other allowing Rani to escape with the man she really loves, a lorry cleaner (Prathap Pothen).

Cast
Prathap Pothen as Dasappan
Achankunju as Velan
Balan K. Nair as Ouseph
Nithya as Rani
Sankaradi
Bahadoor
Meena
Santhakumari as Ammu

Soundtrack
The music was composed by M. S. Viswanathan and the lyrics were written by Poovachal Khader.

References

External links
 

1980s Malayalam-language films
1980 films
Films directed by Bharathan
Films with screenplays by Padmarajan
Films scored by M. S. Viswanathan